The 2023 Brunei Super League is the eighth season of the Brunei Super League, the top league in Brunei for association football clubs, since its establishment in 2012. The league began on 3 March and will conclude in November, with 16 teams playing home and away.

Teams

For this season, the number of teams will be restored to 16. DPMM FC will not be participating due to their imminent re-entry into the Singapore Premier League.  Due to the withdrawals of representatives from the Belait and Tutong districts, AKSE Bersatu and Lun Bawang FC automatically became the two promoted sides.

Foreign players

League table

Results

Matchday 1

Matchday 2

Matchday 3

Season statistics

Top scorers

Hat-tricks

References

External links
Football Association of Brunei Darussalam website 
2023 Brunei Super League Fixtures (Round 1)
2023 Brunei Super League Fixtures (Round 2)

Brunei Super League seasons
Brunei